Ouagadougou Airport , officially Thomas Sankara International Airport Ouagadougou, is an international airport in the center of the capital city of Ouagadougou in Burkina Faso. When the airport was built it was on the southern boundary of the city. Ouagadougou has since experienced rapid urbanization and the airport is now surrounded by urban development.

Besides having outgrown its capacity constraints, Ouagadougou Airport is a source of pollution and risk. The government has plans for a new airport 30 km north of the capital.

In addition to civilian traffic, the airport has a military sector.

Ouagadougou Airport handles about 98% of all scheduled commercial air traffic in Burkina Faso. Air Burkina and Air France handle about 60% of scheduled passenger traffic. Between 2005 and 2011, air passenger traffic at Ouagadougou airport grew at an average annual rate of 7.0%, reaching about 404,726 passengers in 2011 and was estimated to reach 850,000 by 2025.

In 2007 it was the 15th busiest airport in West Africa in passenger volume, just ahead of Port Harcourt (Nigeria) and behind Banjul (Gambia).

The total air cargo grew 71% from 4,350 tons in 2005 to about 7,448 tons in 2009.

Airlines and destinations

Statistics

Military use
The United States military uses the military side of the airport as the hub of its airborne intelligence operations for much of Western Africa.

The surveillance operations are carried out mainly with small, unarmed turboprop aircraft disguised as private planes but full of surveillance equipment. The U.S. spy planes fly hundreds of kilometres north to Mali, Mauritania and the Sahara, where they search for Al-Qaida fighters from the Maghreb. The planes refuel on isolated airstrips favored by African bush pilots, extending their effective flight range by thousands of kilometres.

Ouagadougou is the most important of the approximately dozen air bases that the U.S. established in Africa since 2007.

Plans for a new airport
It was originally expected to be completed around 2018, and the government of Burkina Faso has an $85 million loan from the World Bank to help finance the construction. The government of Burkina Faso believed that the project would cost $618 million. The expected date of opening has been pushed back to December 2021.

The first phase of construction of the new airport was planned for a five-year period beginning in 2013 and finishing in 2018. This phase will focus on the construction of infrastructure that is required to move the operations from Ouagadougou to Donsin. Generally  is sufficient to land virtually any aircraft at sea level, but longer runways are helpful for heavily loaded cargo planes. Space for a second runway and its accompanying infrastructure has been reserved for when growth in air traffic warrants it.

A second expansion phase is planned for 2026–2030 to meet projected increases in demand. At this stage, however, the government of Burkina Faso is seeking investors only for Phase 1.

References

External links

Airports in Burkina Faso
Buildings and structures in Ouagadougou